The following highways are numbered 779:

United States